Znap was a Lego theme that was launched in 1998. It was similar to K'nex and could be used to construct a variety of structures. It moved away from the traditional system of Lego construction and did not gain popularity. The product line was discontinued in 1999.

Release 
Znap was launched in 1998. The pieces were more complex than traditional Lego bricks, which allowed for more complicated architectural creations. The product line aimed to rival a similar construction toy named K'Nex, but did not gain popularity and was discontinued in 1999. Lego Znap was launched at a time in the late 1990s, when The Lego Group was experiencing financial problems, caused by several factors, including infrastructure expansion and an unmanageable increase in the number of produced parts with little gain in sales. Znap is listed by Business Insider as one of several product lines launched during this period "that almost ruined the company."

Description 
Lego Znap was a building system that could be snapped together in a flexible way to create structures such as bridges. The parts were produced in a series of bright colours.

Construction sets 
According to Bricklink, Lego Znap released 19 sets.

1998 sets
3501 Jetcar
3502 Bi-wing
3503 Mini-sonic
3504 Hooktruck
3510 Polybag
3531 Tricycle
3532 Jetski
3551 Dino-Jet
3552 Hover-Sub
3571 Blackmobile
3581 Formula Z Car

 3591 Heli-transport

1999 sets
3505 Airplane
3506 Motorbike
3520 Forklift
3521 Racer
3554 Helicopter
3555 Jeep
3582 Ant

Reception 
Znap is one of several Lego product lines with alternative building systems that have been rejected by some Adult Fans of Lego (AFOL) as "impure" and "not Lego".

See also 

 Lego Technic

References 

Znap
Products introduced in 1998